Starosepyashevo (İśke Säpäş) is a rural locality (a village) in Ibrayevsky Selsoviet, Alsheyevsky District, Bashkortostan, Russia. The population was 133 as of 2010. There are 3 streets.

Geography 
Starosepyashevo is located 5 km east of Rayevsky (the district's administrative centre) by road. Rayevsky is the nearest rural locality.

References 

Rural localities in Alsheyevsky District